Yehuda Kurtzer is President of the Shalom Hartman Institute of North America.  He has written and lectured widely on Jewish history, Jewish memory, leadership in American Jewish life, and the relationship between American Jews, Israel and Zionism. He is known as a leading public intellectual in the American Jewish community.  In 2012, he was named one of the "36 under 36 young educators, thinkers, social justice activists, philanthropists and artists reinventing Jewish life" by The Jewish Week.

Early life and education 

Kurtzer was raised as a Modern Orthodox Jew in, Tel Aviv, Israel, and Silver Spring, MD.  He is a son of U.S. Ambassador Daniel Kurtzer.

He studied Religion and History at Columbia College of Columbia University as an undergraduate student and graduated in 2000. He began graduate study at Brown University in early Christianity, but left that program after a year, later entering the Ph.D. program in Near Eastern Languages and Civilizations at Harvard University. He completed his doctoral degree in Jewish Studies there in 2008.

Career 
Kurtzer was named the first Charles R. Bronfman Visiting Chair of Jewish Communal Innovation at Brandeis University in 2008, where he taught Jewish Studies as part of the Hornstein Jewish Professional Leadership program. The position was awarded after a public competition among 231 proposals for funding to write a book that would change the way Jews think about themselves and their community, including a public symposium among the 5 finalists—Kurtzer and four more senior and at the time more prominent competitors.  Kurtzer's proposal became his book, "Shuva: The future of the Jewish past."
In 2020, Kurtzer along with Dr. Claire Sufrin co-edited The New Jewish Canon, a collection of Jewish debates and ideas, from 1980-2015.

He led the creation of the Shalom Hartman Institute of North America in 2010, and then became president of this organization.  Under his direction, the Institute has expanded to a staff of 44 employees in Chicago, Boston, San Francisco, and Los Angeles, with public programs and activities reaching over 10,000 people per year.  Its activities focus on leadership and educational programs for rabbis and lay leaders of the Jewish community.

Kurtzer also hosts Identity Crisis, a podcast focused on Jewish news and ideas.

He has been a scholar-in-residence and speaker in many American Jewish communities. His speaking topics have included:

 2013: “boundaries and belonging for contemporary Jewish life”
 2014: "Is the Diaspora Good for the Jews?"
 "Different Values, Different Zionist Politics"
 2017: "What Does The Jerusalem Decision Mean For U.S. Jews?"
 2018: "The Moral, the Political and the Partisan: Jewish Community and Jewish Values in an Era of Polarization"
 2019: "Anti-Semitism and the Jewish Collective"
 2019: "The Israel We Imagine"

Notable Print Publications 

 
 
 
 
 , a finalist for the 2020 National Jewish Book Award.

References 

Living people
21st-century American writers
American Zionists
Jewish American writers
Brown University alumni
Harvard University alumni
1977 births
Columbia College (New York) alumni
Writers on Zionism
American Modern Orthodox Jews
Academics from Maryland
Brandeis University faculty